Arabela was a children's television series produced in Czechoslovakia which aired from 1979 to 1981. The series has 13 episodes and is in Czech.

Synopsis
The series revolves around the members of a regular family, the Majers, who encounter people from the Fairy Tale Kingdom. Karel Majer, an actor and fairy tale reader on children's TV, one day finds a small bell which, when rung, summons an enigmatic figure calling himself Rumburak the Magician who claims that he is intent on fulfilling every wish Majer has. In order to please his children at a fair's shooting gallery, Majer wishes to learn to shoot, which Rumburak grants; but the wolf Majer shoots unexpectedly begins to talk in the human tongue as it lies dying. As it turns out, Rumburak has taken Majer to the Realm of Fairy Tales for his shooting lessons, and the wolf was the principal antagonist from the tale of Red Riding Hood. Majer is sent back to the human world, but Rumburak is ousted for this perceived act of mischief and must henceforth play the role of the wolf himself.

Enraged, Rumburak takes revenge on the Fairy Tale Kingdom by establishing a pirate broadcast station in his castle and, by using his magic to impersonate Majer, twisting the fairy tales into grotesque stories, like having the prince from Sleeping Beauty (here named Vilibald) stealing from the sleeping people instead of reawakening them. The King of the Fairy Tale Realm, Hyacint, decides to put Majer under observation and sends his court magician Vigo and his daughters Arabela and Xenia to the human world. Arabela, the kinder and gentler of the two princesses, soon meets and falls in love with Majer's son Petr, while Xenia, spoiled and selfish, takes a liking to the modern world's commodities and eventually wishes to accordingly convert the Fairy Tale World.

Soon, life for the Majers and the royal family turns upside down as the presence of their most important magical items, particularly three Wishing Rings, begins to wreak confusion in both worlds and several members of each side, especially Petr, his younger brother Honzik and their girl neighbor Mařenka, are left stranded in the respective other world. In addition, Rumburak lusts after Arabela and with the help of the Evil Witch, who manages to turn the Queen into a white dove and take her place at the king's side, does everything he can to make her his bride. But with the aid of Fantomas, a denizen of the Realm of Adult Fairy Tales, all is eventually put back in place: Arabela marries Petr and prepares to spend the rest of her life in the human world; Rumburak and the Witch are turned into household appliances just as they make a last-ditch attempt to sabotage the wedding; and the Queen is restored to her rightful place. The only regret is that the magic bell, left by Hyacint with the Majers for emergencies, is soon buried in the garden by the Majers' dachshund, severing the connection between the two worlds for the time being.

Production
Because of Jana Nagyová's distinct accent, which was deemed too hard for children to properly understand, the actual voice of Arabela was provided by Libuše Šafránková. Nagyová and Dagmar Patrasová (Xenié) had also a joint performance in the crime drama Smrt stopařek (lit.: "Killing Hitchhikers", 1979) directed by Jindřich Polák, who is better known for his creation of the children TV's character Pan Tau.

Theodor Pištěk designed the costumes for the series.

Reception
The show aired in 57 other countries as well, like  Yugoslavia (Slovenia and Macedonia), Bulgaria and Romania in the 1980s and also in Croatia in 1990s. It was also very popular in West Germany, where it was renamed Die Märchenbraut (lit: "The Fairy Tale Bride"), while in East Germany it was broadcast under its original title.

Adaptations and sequels
The character of Rumburak has received his own TV movie, called Rumburak (1984), in which Jiří Lábus reprises his role from Arabela. However, in this instance Rumburak is portrayed as a reformed protagonist and sympathetic character, and its story has no direct connection with Arabela. The film was written by Miloš Macourek, and directed by Václav Vorlíček.

There is also a sequel series, Arabela Returns (Arabela se vrací) (1993), with several new stories and figures, but it did not gain the popularity of the original series.

Cast

Protagonists
 Jana Nagyová - Princess Arabela
 Vladimír Dlouhý - Petr Majer
 Jiří Lábus - Rumburak, the mischievous sorcerer who is the primary antagonist of the series.
 Ondřej Kepka - Honzík Majer, Petr's younger brother.
 Veronika Týblová - Mařenka Hermanová, a girl living next to the Majers, and Honzík's agemate and friend.
 Vladimír Menšík - Mr. Karel Majer
 Stella Zázvorková - Mrs. Majerová, Karel Majer's wife.
 Dagmar Patrasová - Princess Xénie
 Jana Andresíková - The Evil Witch, Rumburak's ally in his plans to claim the Fairy Tale Realm and Arabela.
 Vlastimil Brodský - King Hyacint
 Jana Brejchová - Queen
 Jiří Sovák - Vigo the court sorcerer of the Fairy Tale Realm.
 Iva Janžurová - Miss Milerová, Honzík's piano teacher who ends up marrying Rumburak's henchman Blekota.
Rumburak's Henchmen
 František Filipovský - Blekota the devil, later the husband of Miss Milerová and the only henchman who is shown to reform in the course of the series.
 Stanislav Hájek - Pekota, a headless knight.
 Jiří Krytinář - Mekota, a dwarf.
 František Peterka - Fantomas
 Oldřich Vízner - Prince Vilibald, the prince from Sleeping Beauty, who ends up as Xénie's husband.

Minor characters
 Jiří Lír - king's advisor
 Oldřich Velen - king's advisor
 Luděk Kopřiva - headmaster
 Petr Svojtka - psychiatrist Jiří
 Luba Skořepová - witch
 Jan Kraus - Petr's classmate
 Jiří Pleskot - school inspector
 Josef Dvořák - vodník
 Jiří Kodet - director Novák
 Jiří Hrzán - television assistant Gros
 Václav Lohniský - Fousek the thief
 Antonín Jedlička - Adam the teacher
 Ivana Andrlová - Petr's classmate
 Helena Růžičková - storyteller
 Věra Kalendová - woman in kitchen
 Jana Drbohlavová - Mrs. Hermanová
 Lenka Kořínková - maid
 Alena Procházková - arts expert
 Ludmila Roubíková - woman in kitchen
 Dana Vávrová - Red Riding Hood
 Hana Talpová - Mařenka as an adult
 Simona Stašová - maid
 Lenka Termerová - maid
 Ladislav Županič - Mr. Herman
 Jitka Zelenohorská - psychiatric doctor
 Milan Riehs - general
 Milan Neděla - general
 Radim Vašinka - general
 Čestmír Řanda - professor of technology
 Josef Šebek - waiter
 Otto Šimánek - Long
 Václav Sloup - factory technician
 Josef Větrovec - chief psychiatrist

Magic things
The series featured several magic items, starting with the magic rings.
 Magic rings - make any wish become reality
 Magic cape - teleports the wearer from one place to another (usual from fairy tale world to our world)
 Magic wand - less powerful than the magic rings, it can be used only by a wizard
 Crystal globe - it shows a person
 Magic boots - makes its wearer run fast. Based on the Seven-league boots of many European fairy tales.
 Night cap - makes its wearer invisible and allows him to pass through walls
 Suitcase - flight. Based on the tale "The Flying Suitcase" ("Der Fliegende Koffer") by Hans Christian Andersen.
 Broom stick - flight
 Gold bell - calls somebody from the fairy tale world
 Money pouch - endless supply of gold coins
 White Snake - When its flesh is eaten, its consumers (here, Arabela and Rumburak) are able to understand the language of animals. Based on the fairy tale "The White Snake" ("Die Weiße Schlange") by the Brothers Grimm.

External links

References

1979 Czechoslovak television series debuts
1981 Czechoslovak television series endings
Czech children's television series
1970s Czechoslovak television series
1980s Czechoslovak television series
Films based on fairy tales
Czech fantasy television series